The 2017–18 Mississippi Valley State Delta Devils basketball team represented Mississippi Valley State University in the 2017–18 NCAA Division I men's basketball season. The Delta Devils, led by fourth-year head coach Andre Payne, played their home games at the Harrison HPER Complex in Itta Bena, Mississippi as members of the Southwestern Athletic Conference. They finished the season 4–28, 4–14 in SWAC play to finish in ninth place. Due to the ineligibility of Grambling State, the Delta Devils received the No. 8 seed in the SWAC tournament and lost to Arkansas–Pine Bluff in the quarterfinals.

Previous season 
The Delta Devils finished the 2016–17 season 7–25, 7–11 in SWAC play to finish in seventh place. In the SWAC tournament, they lost to Alcorn State in the quarterfinals.

Roster

Schedule and results

|-
!colspan=9 style=|Non-conference regular season

|-
!colspan=9 style=| SWAC regular season

|-
!colspan=9 style=|SWAC tournament

References

Mississippi Valley State Delta Devils basketball seasons
Mississippi Valley State
Mississippi Valley
Mississippi Valley